Marizel Sarangelo-Placido (born November 9, 1980), known professionally as Tuesday Vargas, is a Filipina singer, actress, comedian and a resident judge of TV5's Talentadong Pinoy.

Personal life
Born as Marizel Sarangelo-Placido on November 9, 1980, in Sampaloc, Manila. She is an alumna of Manila Science High School.

Career
Vargas is also known for her TV host and acting work outside of her comedian genre programs she had starred in 2006 on both Gulong ng Palad as Saling and Bituing Walang Ningning as Libby. She starred on Hiram na Mukha in 2007, and Kaputol ng Isang Awit in 2008. In 2010, Tuesday gained recognition in the 2010 film Here Comes the Bride, 2012 independent film Ang Turkey Man Ay Pabo Rin which had a spin-off TV series in 2015 by Unitel Films Television Distribution that aired on TV5, and in the 2019 film LSS (Last Song Syndrome) which was an official entry for the 3rd Pista ng Pelikulang Pilipino.

She is currently a freelance artist seen mostly on GMA Network and TV5 Network but worked with ABS-CBN in the past.

Filmography

Film

Television

Stage
 Legally Blode – Serena (Mermaid)

Accolades

Singles
 Babae Po Ako
 Kuya Wag Po

References

External links

1980 births
Living people
Actresses from Manila
Filipino film actresses
Filipino women pop singers
Filipino television actresses
Filipino women comedians
Filipino parodists
Filipino television variety show hosts
People from Sampaloc, Manila
Tagalog people
University of the Philippines alumni
ABS-CBN personalities
GMA Network personalities
TV5 (Philippine TV network) personalities
21st-century Filipino women singers